Tufahije (singular: tufahija) is a Bosnian dessert made of walnut-stuffed apples poached in sugar water. It is very popular in Bosnia and Herzegovina, Serbia, Macedonia and Croatia.

The Bulgarian pechani yabalki are also stuffed with walnuts, but are usually baked, not poached.

Etymology
The word tufahija comes from Ottoman Turkish tuffāḥa (تفاحة) 'apple', itself borrowed from Arabic.

Serving
Tufahije is served in large glasses with their own glazed syrup and whipped cream on top. It's usually accompanied by coffee.

Gallery

See also 

 Baked apple
 List of apple dishes
 List of desserts
 List of stuffed dishes

References

Bosnia and Herzegovina cuisine
Desserts
Serbian cuisine
Apple dishes
Walnut dishes
Stuffed desserts
Coffee culture